Ocasek is a surname.  Notable people with the surname include:

 Oliver Ocasek (1925–1999), American politician of the Democratic party
 Ric Ocasek (1944–2019), American musician and music producer, leading band member of The Cars
Christopher Otcasek, American singer, son of Ric Ocasek

See also
 

Czech-language surnames